The 1997–98 FIBA EuroCup was the thirty-second edition of FIBA's 2nd-tier level European-wide professional club basketball competition. it occurred between September 16, 1997, and April 14, 1998. The final was held at Pionir Hall, Belgrade, Yugoslavia. In the final, Žalgiris defeated Stefanel Milano, in front of 5,000 spectators.

Competition system
 48 teams (national domestic cup champions, plus the best qualified teams from the most important European national domestic leagues), entered a preliminary group stage, divided into eight groups of six teams each, and played a round-robin. The final standings were based on individual wins and defeats. In the case of a tie between two or more teams, after the group stage, the following criteria were used to decide the final classification: 1) number of wins in one-to-one games between the teams; 2) basket average between the teams; 3) general basket average within the group.
 The top four teams from each group qualified for a 1/16 Final Playoff (X-pairings, home and away games), where the winners advanced further to 1/8 Finals, 1/4 Finals, and 1/2 Final.
 The Final was played at a predetermined venue.

Country ranking
For the 1997–1998 FIBA EuroCup, the countries are allocated places according to their place on the FIBA country rankings, which takes into account their performance in European competitions from 1994–95 to 1996–97.

Team allocation 
The labels in the parentheses show how each team qualified for the place of its starting round:

 1st, 2nd, 3rd, 4th, 5th, etc.: League position after eventual Playoffs
 CW: Cup winners
 WC: Wild card

Preliminary group stage

Round of 32

|}

Round of 16

|}

Quarterfinals

|}

Semifinals

|}

Final
April 14, Hala Pionir, Belgrade

|}

Awards

FIBA Saporta Cup Finals MVP 
 Saulius Štombergas ( Žalgiris)

References

External links
  1997–98 FIBA EuroCup @ FIBA Europe.com
1997–98 FIBA EuroCup @ linguasport.com

FIBA
1997–98